The Man Who Never Missed is the first book in the Matador series, by Steve Perry. It was first published in August 1985.

Plot

The Man Who Never Missed concerns an ex-soldier Emile Khadaji, formerly in the service of the "Confed", a generic star-spanning empire (formerly a confederacy, hence the name)  of solar systems. The Confed has grown large and old, and to maintain its fading grip on power, uses its powerful military to brutally suppress any resistance and to colonialize further worlds. During one such campaign which results in the slaughter of three-quarters of a million people in a single pitched battle, Khadaji snaps and deserts while experiencing a religious epiphany which instills him the belief that taking the lives of sapient beings is wrong and that the Confed must be overthrown. He escapes and is believed dead by his military superiors.

While wandering in the nearby city and pondering his experience, the young Khadaji runs into the mysterious priest "Pen" (Pen being not his real name but rather his title; as the current Pen, Pen goes about enshrouded such that his flesh cannot be seen), of the order of the Siblings of the Shroud. Pen takes Khadaji in as a student, training him in Pen's martial art sumito ("The 97 steps"; based on the martial art Silat, which inspired Perry). Pen also teaches Khadaji the surprisingly complex craft of bartending to the many worlds of the Confed.

While working as a bartender on the world of Rim, Khadaji falls in love with an "exotic" albino—exotic is the term Perry uses for descendants of humans genetically engineered to be sexually attractive, to exude sex pheromones, and to have an extremely high libido. Eventually he realizes the extent to which she cheats on him and how she views his martial arts skills as a useful way to protect herself from lustful males. Khadaji comes to the conclusion that he needs to further his war against the Confed, but bartending on Rim was wasting time. At this point, Pen and Khadaji part ways after a relationship encompassing years.

Travelling to a college planet, Khadaji begins learning economics and politics and military science.  While there, he masters the nonlethal civilian weapon: the spetsdōd.  The spetsdōd is a small weapon which is unobtrusively mounted on the back of one's hands; it is contacted by the index finger to fire. When hyperextended, the  spetsdōd detonates the loaded dart, propelling it down the length of the index finger at whatever the shooter aims at. Within 20 meters, it is described as being an extremely fast and precise weapon—pointshooting taken to its logical conclusion.

With his weapon and target chosen, Khadaji carefully embarks on a large-scale and careful career of smuggling—a career chosen for its ability to garner large sums of money which Khadaji needs and because it does not necessarily compromise his ethics; Khadaji reasons that as long as he does not transport health-compromising narcotics, his will be victimless crimes. His criminal empire grows quickly, and Khadaji devotes his fortunes to combat training with his spetsdōd. Eventually, he decides to test his skills against the best living opponents he can find, in real life-or-death situations:

He considered where he could get such experience. There was the Musashi Flex, a loosely-organized band of modern rōnins who travelled around challenging each other; he could try that. Or, there was The Maze. Such a thing was risky, but it offered a real test. Injury was likely, death a possibility in the game known as The Maze; if he could survive that, maybe he would be ready....

The Musashi Flex would later be the subject of Perry's 2006 novel of the same name. The Maze mentioned is a multiple-day unarmed combat tournament set in a ruined city; the last person conscious wins an extremely large monetary prize. No rules other than not interfering with the medical robots rescuing a downed contestant, and not bringing any weapons with one into the tournament, are observed. Khadaji wins, and is convinced to launch his war.

This he does by buying and fortifying a bar on the recently occupied planet Greaves. While luring soldiers into his bar by day, Khadaji hunts and paralyzes them with a potent cocktail of drugs which induces total paralysis by night; the cocktail does not kill, but requires enormous sums of money and at least six months to cure.  Over many months, he paralyzes 2,388 of the 10,000 troops on the planet, only missing with a handful of shots, which he carefully conceals. His guerilla tactics are so successful that the Confed forces estimate the "Shamba Freedom Forces" (or the "Shamba Scum" as the Confed calls them) to have hundreds of members.

Eventually, he learns that his six months are about to lapse: the first soldiers he paralyzed are recovering. At any time one of the soldiers who saw Khadaji's face might recover and reveal to their compatriots that the genial, friendly, and generous bar-owner Khadaji is actually one of the insurgents. So Khadaji goes for broke.

He calls the head commander of the Confed forces and reveals that he has learned the identity of the leaders of the Shamba Freedom Forces. When Khadaji enters the commander's office, he paralyzes the commander, and successfully escapes and locks himself inside the massive vault inside the bar (used to store receipts and the many drugs that his bar sold in addition to the usual array of alcoholic drinks). There he spends an hour meditating on his past and his life; in this flashback his history is revealed to the reader—the novel started in medias res. The army catches up to Khadaji. His vault is proof against most of their weapons; the officer tasked with his apprehension orders an "implosion" (possibly a miniature black hole) bomb fired against the safe. It, and presumably Khadaji, are compressed into a tiny lump; Khadaji is presumed dead, although the Confed forensics can only conclude that there was a human body in the remains, and not that the remains were of Khadaji. Mysteriously, shortly before the implosion round is fired, Perry writes of Khadaji handling a heavy, large, and secured package stored in the vault for the last six months.

Afterwards, the Confederation military realize that he apparently knocked out almost 2,400 soldiers without missing a single time, a record which quickly becomes a legend, striking fear into the Confederation military ranks.

See also
Kuji-kiri

References

1985 American novels
American science fiction novels
1985 science fiction novels
Ace Books books